Atiprosin (developmental code name AY-28,228) is an antihypertensive agent which acts as a selective α1-adrenergic receptor antagonist. It also possesses some antihistamine activity, though it is some 15-fold weaker in this regard than as an alpha blocker. It was never marketed.

See also
 Prazosin
 Ketanserin

References

External links
 

Abandoned drugs
Alpha-1 blockers
Antihistamines
Antihypertensive agents
Indoles
Isopropyl compounds
Piperazines